Logisticus iners is a species of beetle in the family Cerambycidae. It was described by Fairmaire in 1903.

References

Dorcasominae
Beetles described in 1903